Kim Sook (born July 6, 1975), is a South Korean comedian. The second woman to ever win the Grand Prize in Entertainment (대상), Kim Sook is one of the most sought after female comediennes that has broken barriers and paved the way for female entertainers in South Korea. Debuting at the age of 19, her career has span for almost three decades. She is currently signed with IOK COMPANY, as her agency.

Early life and education
As a teenager, Kim attended . She went on to study at Youngsan University, then known as Seongshim Foreign Language University. She also attended Gukje Cyber University, where she gained a qualification in social work, although it took her 6 years to graduate from the university as she was often too busy to study for the qualification.

Career
In 1995, Kim made her debut in the South Korean entertainment industry after she won silver in the National College Comedy Contest.

In 2016, Kim and fellow comedian Song Eun-i published a book together, based on their podcast, Keeping Secrets.

Personal life
One of Kim's hobbies includes woodworking, having learnt the skill with Song Eun-i when she had little work and broadcasting activity. Not being able to find work during 'the shift' in television entertainment in South Korea, both Song Eun-i and Kim decided to produce their own podcast ' Keeping Secret ' (비밀보장) which at the same time found their own production company 'Content Lab Media VIVO' with Song serving as the CEO and Kim serving as Director. Due the popularity of the podcast, it led them to host their own radio show 'Sister's Radio'(송은이&김숙 언니네 라디오) on SBS LoveFM for three years (2016-2019)

Filmography

Films

Television series

Television  shows

Web series

 This was JTBC's first web series production.

Radio shows

Discography

Solo artist

Unnies

Collaborative singles

Awards and nominations

References

External links
 

1975 births
Living people
IHQ (company) artists
South Korean women comedians
South Korean female idols
People from Busan
Gag Concert
Best Variety Performer Female Paeksang Arts Award (television) winners